Alban Bensa (18 September 1948 – 10 October 2021) was a French anthropologist. He was director of studies at the School for Advanced Studies in the Social Sciences  and specialized in the study of New Caledonia and Kanak people.

Publications

Books
Les Chemins de l'alliance : l'organisation sociale et ses représentations en Nouvelle-Calédonie, région de Touho, aire linguistique cèmuhî (1982)
Chroniques Kanak : l'ethnologie en marche (1995)
Nouvelle-Calédonie, vers l’émancipation (1998)
Ethnologie et architecture : le Centre culturel Tjibaou, Nouméa, Nouvelle-Calédonie (2000)
La fin de l'exotisme : essais d'anthropologie critique (2006)
Après Lévi-Strauss : pour une anthropologie à taille humaine (2010)
Les sanglots de l'aigle pêcheur. Nouvelle-Calédonie : la Guerre kanak de 1917 (2015)

Collections
Les filles du rocher Até : contes et récits paicî (1995)
1878 : carnets de campagne en Nouvelle-Calédonie (2004)
Histoire d'une chefferie kanak, 1740-1878 (2005)
Les politiques de l'enquête (2008)

References

1948 births
2021 deaths
French anthropologists
Writers from Paris
20th-century French male writers
21st-century anthropologists
21st-century French male writers
20th-century anthropologists
Academic staff of the School for Advanced Studies in the Social Sciences